Siliquamomum is a genus of plants in the Zingiberaceae.

Species
Known species are native to Vietnam and southern China.

Siliquamomum alcicorne Škorničk. & H.Đ.Trần
Siliquamomum oreodoxa N.S.Lý & Škorničk - Vietnam
Siliquamomum phamhoangii Luu & H.Đ.Trần
Siliquamomum tonkinense Baill.. - Vietnam, Yunnan

References

Alpinioideae
Zingiberaceae genera
Taxa named by Henri Ernest Baillon